We All Loved Each Other So Much is a 1974 Italian comedy-drama film directed by Ettore Scola and written by Scola and the famous screenwriter duo of Age & Scarpelli. It stars Stefania Sandrelli, Vittorio Gassman, Nino Manfredi, Stefano Satta Flores and Aldo Fabrizi, among others. Widely considered one of the best movies by Scola, and a great example of commedia all'italiana, it was dedicated to famous Italian director Vittorio De Sica.

Plot

Gianni, Antonio and Nicola were resistance fighters (La Resistenza) during the war, sharing everything like brothers. After the war, they returned to their lives. Antonio as a nurse in a Roman hospital, where he fell madly in love with a girl named Luciana. He also belongs to the Popular Front. Gianni entered as an assistant in a law firm, the head of which, La Rosa, is running as a deputy candidate for the Socialist Party. Nicola returned to teaching in a small town high school, married a woman named Gabriella and had a child, Tommasino. He is an intellectual idealist, active member of the Communist Party, as well as a passionate film buff.

The story begins three years after the war, as Antonio is lunching with Luciana in a restaurant when Gianni happens to pass by. Antonio is thrilled and he starts talking about the days of the life in La Resistenza. Luciana and Gianni do not really listen to him, as they fall in love in silence with each other. Antonio sees nothing.

A following night, Gianni and Luciana visit Antonio at the hospital to speak the truth about their affair. Antonio takes the news very calmly even though Luciana is everything to him. Gianni says he is sorry but cannot contain his feelings for her. Luciana tells Antonio she loves him, but says that with Gianni, "it's different". Sad about the two friends splitting over her, she insists that they remain friends. They do not answer but seem to agree. Luciana and Gianni leave until Antonio suddenly runs after them and kicks Gianni. He says he is not surprised by his friend's betrayal, "as you've exploited us for years already", referring to Gianni's political incline.

Around the same period, Nicola is losing his teaching job after a violent argument with his superior about the movie Ladri di Biciclette (Vittorio de Sica, 1948). His wife is desperate, and asks him to apologize to get back his job, which he will not. He leaves wife and child, gets to Roma with a case of books to find Antonio.

Gianni and Luciana live happily and start to have family projects. Gianni is climbing up the ladder, working for the firm as a lawyer. He is asked to defend in court a real estate constructor who had two of his employees die on a site for not respecting security measures. Gianni refuses the case, telling the client that refusal is due to the problems of the firm's head, La Rosa, now a deputy, who is accused of many political and financial misconducts. They are talking on the subject when Elide, the client's youngest daughter enters and falls instantly in love with Gianni. She leaves, and the client tries to bribe Gianni to take the case. Gianni neither accepts nor refuses.

Nicola tries to work in Rome as a film critic and attempts to start a magazine, Cine Culture, but he fails everywhere.

Years later, Antonio and Nicola are having lunch at their usual restaurant when Luciana enters. Antonio is not at ease. Nicola understands it is the same Luciana with his friend was in love. He insists on being introduced, which Antonio reluctantly does. They start talking and Luciana asks about Gianni, who she hasn't seen in a long time. The news fires Antonio's hopes.

Later at night, the three of them are drunk and Nicola is playing a reconstruction on the stairs of Piazza di Spagna of the famous Stairs Scene from the Battleship Potemkin movie (by Sergey Eisenstein, 1925), obviously trying to make Luciana laugh. Antonio is sitting alone, down the stairs, deep in his thoughts, smoking. He can't stand Nicola's game and argues with Luciana. She says she can do whatever she pleases, including becoming an actress. Antonio leaves, pissed, while Luciana hides in a photo-booth and Nicola follows Antonio, trying to calm him down. He fails and returns to Luciana who has left the photo-booth, leaving pictures of her where we see she has been crying tears.

Gianni receives a letter from Nicola saying that Luciana has tried to commit suicide. He wonders why he, who has been away, receives such a letter, and why Nicola is sending it. He nevertheless goes to Luciana's.

Luciana has tried a career on stage but has failed. She lives in a hotel room with other artists. Antonio is already there, nursing her. When Nicola comes back in, she asks him if he told Antonio about "them". Nicola slaps her. She says that their two night story is over and apologizes to Antonio who starts a fight with Nicola, saying he took advantage of her.

When Luciana is feeling better, they all leave the hotel, Luciana takes a bus and the two men go their separate ways in silence. Gianni is watching the scene from behind a news stand but cannot find the courage to confront his old friends.

Years later, Gianni has married Elide, his client's daughter, and is now a rich and powerful lawyer with two children, Fabrizio and Donatella. They are partying for his client's 69th birthday. Elide tells Gianni how happy she is to be married with him and about that other life, she would have had, if he had married another woman. This flashes Gianni back to Luciana, his forgotten love.

Gianni and Elide are having a family diner when they see Nicola on TV in a quiz show about Italian cinema. Antonio also happens to see the show from his ward. Nicola answers all the questions right and wins a considerable amount of money and the right to come back the following week on the show. He immediately calls his wife, with whom he is reconciled. She advises that he takes the money without risking it at the next show. He claims his target is not the money but that his book "Cinema as a school" be published, which an editor promised to do if he won the grand prize of the show.

The next show begins. Nicola plays double or nothing, risking to loose all he has won. He is asked a question about Vittorio de Sica which he answers but his answer is deemed wrong by the jury. He complains but is expelled from the show, losing the money.

Antonio is still working in the hospital. One night he is in an ambulance blocked by the shooting of the famous scene of the Fontana di Trevi from La Dolce Vita (Federico Fellini, 1960). He sees the movie's main actor and playboy, Marcello Mastroianni talking to an actress: Luciana.

The ex-lovers sit down for a talk. Antonio is worried to see she has developed an alcoholic habit. As in love as on the first day, he is inviting her to dinner for the next evening when her impresario shows up and says she is busy that evening. Antonio starts a fight. She asks not to see him again.

A decade later, Gianni is a cold-blooded businessman. He quarrels with his father-in-law over a real estate project. They come to blows and the father-in-law sees he is too old and weak to stop Gianni. He gives him power to decide over the business.

Antonio is living with a girl named Valeria. The couple is strolling in a public garden when they meet Luciana.

She asks about Gianni, but he has no news from him. A boy comes to talk to them, it is Luciana's son, Luigi. Antonio and Luciana start to see more of each other, she works as an usher and lives alone with her child.

Gianni has a wonderful house in the countryside, where he can avoid his wife as much as he wants until one day, desperate to talk to him, she catches him as he goes to work. She confesses that in her despair, she has met another man. He believes she made the whole story up to upset him. Tired of the game, willing to prove her love, she takes her car, starts the engine and rushes to her death.

Nicola and a friend are at a festival where Vittorio De Sica is being interviewed. He tells the anecdote proving that Nicola was right in his answer in the show. This saddens Nicola. His friend tells him to go talk to De Sica, the model of all his life, but Nicola refuses, saying he has no more to say to him. He wanted to change the world, but the world has changed him.

Antonio is driving into Rome when he sees Gianni. He goes to him, they awkwardly talk, realizing they have not seen each other in some 25 years. Gianni pretends to be broke. They agree on meeting with Nicola, who is now a stringer for a newspaper. Gianni knows he will not go to the meeting but when he returns to his palace, he realizes it is empty, his wife is dead, his children are gone, only his father-in-law, who will not die, remains. Gianni realizes he is doomed and he decides to go to the meeting with his old friends.

The three meet in the usual restaurant and talk joyfully about the past. Gianni breaks the good mood when he says they are a generation of bastards who did nothing to fulfill the hopes they had for a better world when the war ended. They blame each other's political views and fight again, drunk in the streets. When they stop, Nicola breaks into tears for what seems to be an acceptation of his failure. Instead, he reveals that his son is getting married, and that he actually cries for joy.

They all take a car and go to Antonio's wife, who turns up to be Luciana. When Nicola and Gianni see her, they realize they both still have feelings for her. Gianni is left talking alone with Luciana and tells her that he stayed in love with her through all the years. She says she didn't think of him one bit. Gianni leaves while Nicola realizes he has the driving license of Gianni in his pocket.

Morning, Nicola, Antonio and Luciana go to Gianni's house to see that he lied when he said he was broke. They leave the license at the door and leave, arguing with each other for nothing, like they did all their lives.

Cast
 Nino Manfredi as Antonio
 Vittorio Gassman as Gianni Perego
 Stefania Sandrelli as Luciana Zanon
 Stefano Satta Flores as Nicola Palumbo
 Giovanna Ralli as Elide Catenacci, Romolo's daughter
 Aldo Fabrizi as Romolo Catenacci
 Elena Fabrizi as Wife of Romolo Catenacci
 Marcella Michelangeli as Gabriella, wife of Nicola
 Ugo Gregoretti as Presenter
 Mike Bongiorno as Himself
 Federico Fellini as Himself
 Marcello Mastroianni as Himself
 Nello Meniconi as Himself
 Guidarino Guidi as Himself
 Vittorio De Sica as Himself
 Alfonso Crudele as Edoardo
 Isa Barzizza as Elena

Awards
The film won a César Award for Best Foreign Film in 1977. It also won two Silver Ribbons (Italian cinema critics award, for Fabrizi and Ralli) and the Golden Prize in the 9th Moscow International Film Festival in 1975.

References

External links

1974 films
1970s Italian-language films
Films directed by Ettore Scola
1974 comedy-drama films
Best Foreign Film César Award winners
Commedia all'italiana
Films set in Rome
Films shot in Rome
Films with screenplays by Age & Scarpelli
Films scored by Armando Trovajoli
Italian comedy-drama films
Films with screenplays by Ettore Scola
1970s Italian films